Dazkırı District is a district of Afyonkarahisar Province of Turkey. Its seat is the town Dazkırı. Its area is 408 km2, and its population is 11,364 (2021). Lake Acıgöl, the second-largest alkaline lake in the world, is largely within this district. On the Denizli side of the lake there are plants extracting sodium sulphate, but the Dazkırı lake-shore is still agricultural. There is also potential for mining chrome and other minerals.

Composition
There is one municipality in Dazkırı District:
 Dazkırı

There are 16 villages in Dazkırı District:

 Akarca
 Arıköy
 Aşağıyenice
 Bozan
 Çiftlikköy
 Darıcılar
 Hasandede
 Hisaralan
 İdrisköy
 Karaağaçkuyusu
 Kızılören
 Örtülü
 Sarıkavak
 Yaylaköy
 Yukarıyenice
 Yüreğil

References

External links
 District governor's official website 

Districts of Afyonkarahisar Province